Dan Frazier (born 13 December 1988) is an ex-rugby union player who previously played for Newcastle Falcons in the Aviva Premiership, having been at Harlequins and the Doncaster Knights beforehand. A tight head prop who loves scrummaging, whilst still at school he played tight-head for his junior club Chobham and as a 17-year-old played 1st XV with them, in 2007/08/09 Frazier made 1st XV appearances for Rosslyn Park in National League 3.

For the 2009/10 season Frazier, played for Esher in National 1 helping them gain promotion to The Championship.

The 22-year-old prop has joined Doncaster Knights from Harlequins for the 2010/11 season. Frazier, who stands 6' 3" tall and weighs in at over 18 stone, has been a member of the Quins Academy for the past three seasons and has been playing regularly in the "A" XV league. He was on the bench for the full Quins side in the last Premiership game of the season against Sale.

Frazier was unfortunately forced to retire from Newcastle Falcons in 2012 after suffering a severe back injury with a torn spinal disc. After surgery and lengthy recovery training, he has since moved on to weightlifting, competing in various Strongman events and also running his own company 'Barbells and Beans' with a speciality coffee shop. Frazier has not ruled out a return to rugby.

References

External links

Living people
1988 births
English rugby union players
Harlequin F.C. players
Doncaster R.F.C. players
Rugby union props